Sivert Christensen Strøm (August 9, 1819  – 13 November 1902) was a Norwegian jurist and politician.

He was born at Øyestad (now Arendal) in Aust-Agder to captain Christen Nielsen Strøm. He graduated as cand.jur. in 1845. He first worked as attorney, and was then promoted to stipendiary magistrate (sorenskriver) in the district of Nordre Østerdalen in 1859.
 He became involved in politics, and was elected to the Norwegian Parliament in 1859, 1862 and 1865, representing the constituency of Hedemarkens Amt (now Hedmark). During the last term he was also mayor of his local municipality.

In 1867 he succeeded Michael Aubert as burgomaster of Trondhjem (now Trondheim). While serving in Trondhjem he was elected to the Norwegian Parliament in 1871 and 1877. He was also a director in the Bank of Norway in 1871.

Strøm married twice, and had several children.

References

1819 births
1902 deaths
People from  Aust-Agder  
Members of the Storting
Mayors of places in Hedmark
Politicians from Trondheim
Norwegian jurists